Paygah-e Panjam Shakari (also Romanized as Pāygāh-e Panjam Shaḵārī) is a village in Azadeh Rural District, Moshrageh District, Ramshir County, Khuzestan Province, Iran. At the 2006 census, its population was 2,896, in 919 families.

References 

Populated places in Ramshir County